The 2007 Women's South American Volleyball Championship was the 27th edition of the Women's South American Volleyball Championship, organised by South America's governing volleyball body, the Confederación Sudamericana de Voleibol (CSV). It was held in Santiago, Chile from September 26 to 30, 2007.

Teams

Squads

Preliminary round

Pool A

|}

Pool B

|}

Final round

5th/8th bracket

Championship bracket

5th to 8th classification

Semifinals

Seventh place

Fifth place

Third place

First place

Final standing

Individual awards

Most Valuable Player

Best Spiker

Best Blocker

Best Server

Best Digger

Best Setter

Best Receiver

Best Libero

References

Women's South American Volleyball Championships
South American Volleyball Championships
Volleyball
V
2007 in South American sport
September 2007 sports events in South America